The Kid's Clever is a 1929 American comedy film directed by William James Craft and written by Jack Foley, Ernest Pagano and Albert DeMond. The film stars Glenn Tryon, Kathryn Crawford, Russell Simpson, Lloyd Whitlock, George Chandler and Joan Standing. The film was released on February 17, 1929, by Universal Pictures.

Cast        
Glenn Tryon as Bugs Raymond
Kathryn Crawford as Ruth Decker
Russell Simpson as John Decker
Lloyd Whitlock as Ashton Steele
George Chandler as Hank
Joan Standing as A Girl
Max Asher as Magician
Florence Turner as Matron
Virginia Sale as Secretary
Stepin Fetchit as Negro Man

References

External links
 

1929 films
1920s English-language films
Silent American comedy films
1929 comedy films
Universal Pictures films
Films directed by William James Craft
American silent feature films
American black-and-white films
1920s American films